Elgin Falls is a waterfall in Sri Lanka, located in the Elgin tea estate which is  from Nuwara Eliya, Sri Lanka. There are several ways to access the waterfall. When traveling by railway between Nanu Oya and Ambewela the falls can be seen picturesquely.

See also
 Locations in Sri Lanka with a Scottish name
 List of waterfalls of Sri Lanka

Notes

References

 

Waterfalls of Sri Lanka
Plunge waterfalls
Waterfalls in Central Province, Sri Lanka